"Don't Dull" is a song by Nigerian singer Wizkid. Produced entirely by Samklef, the song was released as the third single from his debut studio album Superstar (2011). The song's production features talking drums and is infused with traditional Nigerian elements. A departure from Wizkid's teen hearthrob sound, "Don't Dull" showcases the singer's indigenous influences and street appeal.

Critical recpetion
In a review for Native Magazine, Debola Abimbolu said "Don't Dull" "established Wizkid's street appeal" and called it a "cult classic".

Remix
Akon was featured on the official remix. A snippet of the remix was leaked on 26 October 2011. NotJustOk reported that both parties didn't set a release date. According to an article posted on Information Nigeria's website, Akon expressed interest in collaborating with Wizkid after watching him perform at an event in the UK.

Track listing
 Digital single

Release history

References

2011 singles
Wizkid songs
Akon songs
2011 songs
Songs written by Wizkid